After World War II the Soviets obtained samples of captured Nazi technology, including a seahund submarine. The submarine was for the special forces and is currently used by Azerbaijan.

References
http://englishrussia.com/2013/11/04/soviet-midget-submarine-triton/

Submarines